Office Hall is an unincorporated community in King George County, Virginia, United States. The main roads in Office Hall are U.S. Route 301 and Virginia State Route 3.

References

Unincorporated communities in Virginia
Unincorporated communities in King George County, Virginia